Franz Eckerle (24 April 1912 – 14 February 1942) was a German Luftwaffe military aviator and aerobatics pilot. As a fighter ace during World War II, he was credited with 59 aerial victories, four over the Western Allies and 55 on the Eastern Front. A flying ace or fighter ace is a military aviator credited with shooting down five or more enemy aircraft during aerial combat.

Born in Baden-Baden, Eckerle grew up in the German Empire, the Weimar Republic and Nazi Germany. Already trained as a pilot, he joined the military service in the Luftwaffe in 1935. Following further training, he was posted to Jagdgeschwader 135. In 1938 and 1939, Eckerle competed in the German Aeronautical Nationals. At the outbreak of World War II, he was serving with Jagdgeschwader 76 and claimed his first aerial victory on 15 May 1940 during the Battle of France. Following further aerial victories claimed during the Battle of Britain and Operation Barbarossa, the German invasion of the Soviet Union, Eckerle was awarded the Knight's Cross of the Iron Cross on 18 September 1941. In January 1942, Eckerle was appointed Gruppenkommandeur (group commander) of I. Gruppe (1st group) of Jagdgeschwader 54. Following aerial combat on 14 February 1942, he went missing in action, presumed killed in action, near Schlüsselburg. Posthumously, Eckerle was awarded the Knight's Cross of the Iron Cross with Oak Leaves on 12 March 1942 for 59 aerial victories.

Early life and career
Eckerle was born on 24 April 1912 in Baden-Baden, at the time in the Grand Duchy of Baden of the German Empire. Already trained as a pilot, he joined the military service of the Luftwaffe on 1 April 1935. On 1 April 1937, Eckerle was promoted to Leutnant (second lieutenant) and posted to the I. Gruppe (1st group) of Jagdgeschwader 135 (JG 135—135th Fighter Wing) based in Bad Aibling. The Gruppe had just been created on 15 March and was commanded by Major Max Ibel.

In 1938, flying a Klemm Kl 35, Eckerle took fourth place in 10th German Aeronautical Nationals in Nuremberg. The following year, flying a Bücker Bü 133 Jungmeister, he took second place at the 11th German Aeronautical Nationals in Frankfurt.

Following the Anschluss, Austria's annexation into Nazi Germany on 12 March 1938, Eckerle was posted to I. Gruppe of Jagdgeschwader 138 (JG 138—138th Fighter Wing) stationed in Wien-Schwechat also referred to as the "Wiener-Jagdgruppe" ("Vienna fighter group"). There, he was appointed Staffelkapitän (squadron leader) of 3. Staffel (3rd squadron) of JG 138 in 1939. On 1 May 1939, his unit I./JG 138 was re-designated I. Gruppe of Jagdgeschwader 76 (I./JG 76—1st group of the 76th Fighter Wing).

World War II
World War II in Europe began on Friday 1 September 1939 when German forces invaded Poland. In preparation of the invasion, I. Gruppe of JG 76 had been moved to an airfield at Stubendorf, present-day Izbicko in Poland, in mid-August 1939 and supported the German advance on the central and southern sectors of the front. On 14 September, I. Gruppe was withdrawn from combat operations and returned to its home airfield at Wien-Aspern where it arrived on 26 September. On 26 October, the Gruppenstab (headquarters unit) and 1. Staffel were ordered to Frankfurt Rhein-Main where it was united again with 2. and 3. Staffel on 2 November. From Frankfurt Rhein-Main, the Gruppe flew fighter protection during the "Phoney War" for the Frankfurt, Rhine and Saar region. In April 1940, I. Gruppe moved to an airfield at Mainz-Finthen, originally named Fliegerhorst Ober-Olm. The Gruppe stayed at Ober-Olm until the Battle of France began. Supporting the German crossing of the Meuse, Eckerle claimed his first and only aerial victory over a Supermarine Spitfire fighter on 15 May during the Battle of Sedan.

On 26 June 1940, I. Gruppe of JG 76 was moved to the airfield at Waalhaven in the Netherlands and subordinated to Jagdgeschwader 54 (JG 54—54th Fighter Wing). There, the Gruppe was tasked with providing aerial protection over the Dutch coastal area. On 5 July, I./JG 76 was officially integrated into JG 54 and was renamed to II./JG 54 and 3./JG 76 became 6./JG 54. On 25 August, II. Gruppe of JG 54 was placed under the command of Hauptmann Dietrich Hrabak.

War against the Soviet Union
Following the surrender of the Royal Yugoslav Army on 17 April 1941, while stationed at an airfield at Zemun near Belgrade, the Geschwader received orders on 3 May 1941 to turn over all Bf 109-Es so they could receive the new Bf 109-F variant. Transition training was completed at Airfield Stolp-Reitz in Pomerania. Following intensive training, the Geschwader was moved to airfields in Eastern Prussia. On 18 June, II. Gruppe relocated to Neukuhren, present-day Pionersky, and then to Trakehnen, present-day Yasnaya Polyana, on 20 June. The Wehrmacht launched Operation Barbarossa, the invasion of the Soviet Union, on 22 June with II. Gruppe supporting Army Group North in its strategic goal towards Leningrad. Prior, Eckerle was promoted to Hauptmann (captain) on 1 June 1941.

On the first day of the invasion, II. Gruppe flew multiple missions in support of German bombers attacking Soviet airfields near Kowno, present-day Kaunas. That day, Eckerle claimed a Tupolev SB bomber shot down. This was his fifth aerial victory in total. On 25 June, the Gruppe followed the German advance and relocated to an airfield at Kowno. Two days later they moved to Dünaburg, present-day Daugavpils. On 28 June, the 8th Panzer Division had established a bridgehead across the Daugava. Operating from Dünaburg, Eckerle claimed three Ilyushin DB-3 bombers shot down on 30 June over the bridgehead. Following his 30th aerial victory, Eckerle was awarded the Knight's Cross of the Iron Cross on 18 September. The presentation was made by General der Flieger Helmuth Förster, commanding general of the I. Fliegerkorps (1st Air Corps).

In early November, the Gruppe was withdrawn from the Eastern Front for a period of rest and replenishment where they were based at airfields in Döberitz, and later at Uetersen. By 20 December, the Gruppe had received 40 Focke Wulf Fw 190 A fighter aircraft. The order for conversion to the Fw 190 was recanted and ordered to Jesau near Königsberg, present-day Kaliningrad in Russia, where they received 40 Bf 109-F-4 aircraft. During this period, Eckerle was transferred to the Gruppenstab of I. Gruppe of JG 54. Command of 6. Staffel was then passed to Hauptmann Carl Sattig.

Group commander and death
On 5 January 1942, Eckerle was appointed Gruppenkommandeur (group commander) of I. Gruppe of JG 54. He succeeded Hauptmann Erich von Selle who was transferred. The Gruppe was based at Krasnogvardeysk, present-day Gatchina and fought in the aerial battles of the Siege of Leningrad. On 7 January, the Soviet Volkhov Front attacked German forces at Volkhov river while the Soviet Northwestern Front attacked south of Lake Ilmen in what became the Battle of Lyuban. That day, Soviet bombers attacked Ziverskaya Airfield, defending against this attack, Eckerle shot down one aircraft. Over thex days, the Gruppe again flew missions in support of the Heer (army) along the Volkhov in the combat area southeast of Leningrad near Tosno. On 13 January, Eckerle was credited with shooting down a SB-2 bomber followed by two Polikarpov I-16 fighters shot down on 19 January.

Eckerle was forced to make an emergency landing in his Messerschmitt Bf 109 F-4 (Werknummer 9728—factory number) behind Soviet lines near Woronowo, southeast of Schlüsselburg, on 14 February 1942. He was posted as missing in action and presumed killed. He was posthumously honored with the Knight's Cross of the Iron Cross with Oak Leaves on 12 March 1942 for 59 aerial victories. Eckerle was succeeded by Hauptmann Hans Philipp as commander of I. Gruppe. He was likely shot down by Mladshiy Leytenant Petrukhin, Mladshiy Leytenant Markov, and Serzhant Savosin from 71 IAP (Fighter Aviation Regiment—Istrebitelny Aviatsionny Polk) of the KBF (Krasnoznamyonnyy Baltiyskiy Flot), the air force of the Red Banner Baltic Fleet. Page states that he was shot near Velikiye Luki.

Summary of career

Aerial victory claims
According to US historian David T. Zabecki, Eckerle was credited with 59 aerial victories. Mathews and Foreman, authors of Luftwaffe Aces – Biographies and Victory Claims, researched the German Federal Archives and found documentation for 59 aerial victory claims, all of which confirmed. This number includes 55 on the Eastern Front and four on the Western Front.

Awards
 Iron Cross (1939)
 2nd Class (13 September 1939)
 1st Class (11 August 1940)
 Knight's Cross of the Iron Cross with Oak Leaves
 Knight's Cross on 18 September 1941 as Hauptmann and Staffelkapitän  of the 1./Jagdgeschwader 54
 82nd Oak Leaves on 12 March 1942 as Hauptmann and Gruppenkommandeur of the I./Jagdgeschwader 54

Notes

References

Citations

Bibliography

 
 
 
 
 
 
 
 
 
 
 
 
 
 
 
 
 
 
 
 
 
 

1917 births
1940s missing person cases
1942 deaths
Aerobatic pilots
German World War II flying aces
Missing in action of World War II
Luftwaffe personnel killed in World War II
Luftwaffe pilots
Military personnel from Baden-Württemberg
People from Baden-Baden
Recipients of the Knight's Cross of the Iron Cross with Oak Leaves